Buffalo Creek is a stream in Union County, South Carolina, in the United States.

Buffalo Creek was named from the fact pioneer settlers saw buffalo there.

See also
List of rivers of South Carolina

References

Rivers of Union County, South Carolina
Rivers of South Carolina